Millennium Final was a Germany-only professional wrestling pay-per-view (PPV) event from World Championship Wrestling (WCW). It took place on November 16, 2000 from the Arena Oberhausen in Oberhausen, Germany, marking the finale of WCW's "Millennium Tour". The rights to Millennium Final now belong to WWE after their purchase of WCW in 2001. Sting's European Cup defense against Kevin Nash is included as part of the Sting: The Icon Defined collection on WWE Network.

Storylines
The event featured wrestlers from pre-existing scripted feuds and storylines. Wrestlers portrayed villains, heroes, or less distinguishable characters in the scripted events that built tension and culminated in a wrestling match or series of matches.

Event 

The opening bout was a tag team match pitting The Filthy Animals (Billy Kidman and Rey Mysterio Jr.) against KroniK (Brian Adams and Bryan Clark). The bout was won by Kronik, with Kidman being pinned after receiving High Times from Kronik.

The second bout was an 18-man Royal Rumble-style battle royal with the stipulation that the winner would take part in a triple threat match to determine who would face Sting for the WCW European Cup. The battle royal was won by Mike Awesome, who last eliminated Alex Wright.

The third bout was a singles match between Elix Skipper and Kwee Wee. Kwee Wee won the bout by pinfall using a roll-up.

The fourth bout was a singles match between Ernest Miller and Mike Sanders with the stipulation that the winner would be named Commissioner of WCW. Miller won the bout by pinfall following a spin kick.

The fifth bout saw WCW United States Heavyweight Champion Lance Storm defend his title against General Rection. Rection won the bout by disqualification, meaning Storm retained his title.

The sixth bout was an "Octoberfest hardcore match" between Fit Finlay and Norman Smiley. Smiley won the bout by pinfall after driving Finlay through a table.

The seventh bout saw WCW World Tag Team Champions The Natural Born Thrillers (Mark Jindrak and Sean O'Haire) defend their titles against Alex Wright and General Rection (substituting for Disco Inferno). Wright won the bout by pinning Jindrak following a missile dropkick, winning the WCW World Tag Team Championship for himself and Disco Inferno.

The eighth bout was a triple threat match between Alex Wright, Kevin Nash, and Mike Awesome, with the winner facing Sting for the WCW European Cup. Nash won the match by pinning both other men.

The ninth bout saw WCW World Heavyweight Champion Booker T defend his title against Scott Steiner. Booker T won the match by pinfall following a scissor kick.

The main event saw Kevin Nash and Sting face one another for the WCW European Cup, with the German boxer Axel Schulz as special guest referee. Sting won the match by submission.

Reception 

In 2011, Thomas Hall of KB's Wrestling Reviews gave the event a rating of D+, stating, "This was just not that good. To be fair though, most European shows aren’t. The fans were kind of there but this had nothing on an English crowd. The guys on the lower half of the card worked very hard and the guys on the main event didn’t, so it fits very well. There’s a lot of house show stuff in here and it’s just not that interesting. If you can actually find this, don’t bother watching it unless you speak German or just REALLY like WCW."

Results 

 General Rection replaced Disqo (who was injured) as Alex Wright's tag team partner in the WCW World Tag Team Championship match against The Natural Born Thrillers (Mark Jindrak and Sean O'Haire) who were the WCW World Tag Team Champions at the time, Disqo is recognized by WWE as one-half of the WCW World Tag Team Champions with Alex Wright.

References

External links 
 

2000 in Germany
2000 World Championship Wrestling pay-per-view events
Entertainment events in Germany
November 2000 events in Europe
Professional wrestling in Germany
World Championship Wrestling pay-per-view events